Wendy Sly MBE (née Smith, born 5 November 1959) is a female British former athlete, who competed mainly in the 3000 metres. She won a silver medal in the event at the 1984 Los Angeles Olympics. She won the 1983 10km World Road Race Championships in San Diego.

Early life
Sly was born in Hampton, Greater London, England. She attended Spelthorne College, then studied English literature at Loughborough University from 1978-81.

Career
In 1978, as Wendy Smith, she finished 43rd at the World Cross Country Championships, and won a team bronze medal. In 1980, she was the UK number one in the 3000 metres and finished second in the 1500 metres at the UK Championships. In 1982, at the Commonwealth Games in Brisbane, she won a silver medal in the 3000 metres, running 8:48.47 behind Anne Audain.

In 1983, now competing as Wendy Sly, she finished fifth in the finals of both the 1500 metres and the 3000 metres at the inaugural World Championships in Helsinki. She ran her lifetime bests in both events, 4:04.14 in the 1500 m and 8:37.06 in the 3000 m. Also that year, she won the IAAF World Women's Road Race Championships in San Diego contested over 10 km.

At her first Olympic Games in 1984 in Los Angeles, Sly won a silver medal in the 3000 metres, a race most remembered for the collision between Mary Decker and Zola Budd, with whom she had a strong rivalry. She ran a season's best of 8:39.47. 

Sly represented England again in the 3,000 metres event, at the 1986 Commonwealth Games in Edinburgh, Scotland, finishing eighth. She finished eighth in the 1987 World Championships 3000 metres final in Rome. Then at her second Olympics in Seoul, she finished seventh in the 3000 metres final in 8:37.70, her fastest time in five years. She represented England in the 10,000 metres event at the 1990 Commonwealth Games in Auckland, New Zealand, but did not finish.

As of 2019, Sly still ranks in the UK all-time top 10 lists in the 3000 metres (9th with 8:37.06 1983), 10 km road (4th with 31:29 in 1983) and 15 km road (4th with 48:17 in 1985).

She was appointed Member of the Order of the British Empire (MBE) in the 2015 New Year Honours for services to athletics.

Personal life
She married middle-distance runner Chris Sly in 1982. In 1997, she had a son, Max Heath. In 2013, she married her long-term partner, Andrew, whom she met through working together for her former university colleague and friend Sebastian Coe.

National titles
1986 UK 3000 metres Champion
1987 AAA Championships 3000 metres Champion
1988 AAAs Indoor 3000 metres Champion

International competitions

References

External links 
 

1959 births
Living people
People from Hampton, London
Athletes from London
English female middle-distance runners
English female long-distance runners
English female cross country runners
Olympic athletes of Great Britain
Olympic silver medallists for Great Britain
Olympic silver medalists in athletics (track and field)
Athletes (track and field) at the 1984 Summer Olympics
Athletes (track and field) at the 1988 Summer Olympics
Medalists at the 1984 Summer Olympics
Commonwealth Games medallists in athletics
Commonwealth Games silver medallists for England
Athletes (track and field) at the 1982 Commonwealth Games
Athletes (track and field) at the 1986 Commonwealth Games
Athletes (track and field) at the 1990 Commonwealth Games
Members of the Order of the British Empire
Alumni of Loughborough University
IAAF World Women's Road Race Championships winners
Medallists at the 1982 Commonwealth Games